Niusuamalie "Niu" Sale (born November 17, 1969) is a former American football player who played three seasons in the Arena Football League with the Sacramento Attack, Miami Hooters and Massachusetts Marauders. He first enrolled at El Camino College before transferring to the University of Missouri. He attended Bishop Montgomery High School in Torrance, California.

References

External links
Just Sports Stats
College stats

Living people
1969 births
Players of American football from Torrance, California
American football wide receivers
American football defensive backs
El Camino Warriors football players
Missouri Tigers football players
Sacramento Attack players
Miami Hooters players
Massachusetts Marauders players